Uprising is the sixth full-length album by Swedish metal band Entombed. It was released in 2000. Album was recorded at Das Boot Studios and produced by Nico Elgstrand and Entombed. Musically, this album abandons the commercial alternative metal-stylings of Same Difference and instead returns to a heavier, more straight-forward death 'n' roll sound reminiscent of Wolverine Blues.

Track listing

Personnel
Lars-Göran Petrov – vocals
Uffe Cederlund – guitar, backing vocals, organ
Alex Hellid – guitar
Jörgen Sandström – bass
Peter Stjärnvind – drums

Guests musicians
Jonas Lundberg – maracas on "Insanity's Contagious", tambourine on "Time Out
Fred Estby – drums on "Year In Year Out" and "Returning to Madness"

References

External links
Amazon.com entry

Entombed (band) albums
2000 albums